Alison Ramsay (born 28 July 1982) is a former Scottish international cricketer whose career for the Scottish national side spanned from 2001 to 2006.  She played in four women's one-day internationals.

Ramsay was born at Stirling in 1982.

References

External links

1982 births
Living people
Cricketers from Stirling
Scotland women One Day International cricketers
Scottish women cricketers
Wicket-keepers